The Barbary wild boar  (Sus scrofa algira) is a smaller subspecies of wild boar native to North Africa including Morocco, Algeria and Tunisia. It is a prey animal for past and present predators of the Atlas Mountains, such as striped hyenas, Atlas bears, African leopards and Barbary lions.

See also
 Sus scrofa

References

Suidae
North African boar
Mammals of North Africa
Suids of Africa
North African boar
Taxa named by Victor Loche